Lauren Campbell (née Groves, born September 2, 1981) is a triathlete from Canada, who won the bronze medal at the 2007 Pan American Games in Rio de Janeiro, Brazil, and competed at the 2008 Summer Olympics in Beijing. She is currently ranked no. 48 in the world by the International Triathlon Union.

Biography
Born in Vancouver, British Columbia, Campbell started out her sporting career while she was swimming competitively in a local club at the age of six, and also ran cross-country, and track and field. By the age of nineteen, she decided to focus on triathlon upon her admission at the Queen's University in Kingston, Ontario, and began training at the Queen's University Triathlon Club. After completing her psychology degree, major in forensics, at the Queen's University, Campbell moved to Victoria, British Columbia, where she trained full-time through Pacific Sport at the National Triathlon Training Centre. Campbell also admitted that she had never heard of triathlon, until she watched Simon Whitfield competing and winning the gold medal in the men's event at the 2000 Summer Olympics in Sydney.<

Triathlon career
Campbell made her sporting debut at the 2001 ITU Triathlon World Championship in Edmonton, Alberta, under the junior category, where she finished only in thirty-first place. She later and further improved on her athletic performance and forty-hour weekly training to set her fourth-place finish at the 2003 ITU Triathlon World Under-23 Championships in Queenstown, New Zealand. After achieving her first best result, Campbell was ranked as one of Canada's top triathletes, and continued to build her success in triathlon by winning the 2006 ITU Triathlon Pan American Cup in Roatan, Honduras, and her first national championship in Brampton, Ontario. Campbell reached higher into the international level, when she finished fourth, yet missed out the podium at the 2006 ITU Triathlon World Championships in Lausanne, Switzerland. Her fourth-place finish at the world championships was the best result by a Canadian female triathlete since Carol Montgomery in 2000.  She was also ranked third in a career-high World Cup competition after placing eight in Edmonton.

Campbell qualified for the 2007 Pan American Games in Rio de Janeiro, Brazil, and won the bronze medal in the women's triathlon with a time of 1:59:50, just behind the U.S. triathletes Julie Ertel and Sarah Haskins, who both claimed the gold and silver, respectively. Following her success at the Pan American Games, Campbell emerged as a medal contender in the international stage, particularly with the World Cup and the Olympics. She won silver at the 2008 PATCO Pan American Championships in Mazatlan, Mexico, and finished thirteenth at the ITU Triathlon World Cups in Tongyeong, South Korea and Richards Bay, South Africa.

Campbell was selected to the national team, along with Carolyn Murray and Kathy Tremblay, for the 2008 Summer Olympics in Beijing, and awarded a qualifying place in the women's triathlon. After finishing second at the Pan American Championships and posting a pair of thirteenth-place finishes on the World Cup circuit, she was in good physical form to compete at the Olympics, yet overcame with knee problems that had plagued her most of the year. In the women's event, Campbell started out as a possibility of a top ten finish, and maintained her pace in the swimming leg. Finishing only in thirty-first place at both the swimming and first transition phase, Campbell had moved her way into a small group of competitors chasing the breakaways of the 40-km cycling race, until one of them went down in front of her, and crashed her bike. Unfortunately, she got lapped into the cycling course, and did not finish the race. While the other competitors crossed the finish line in the final leg, Campbell found herself en route to the hospital, where the medical staff confirmed that she had a fractured radial head bone in her left elbow. With Campbell being injured, her teammates, Murray and Tremblay, finished the event in twenty-ninth and thirty-first place, respectively.

After missing out the 2008 season with an elbow and knee injury, Campbell made a comeback in the local and international triathlon scene for the following year. She captured her first World Cup podium finish, by winning the bronze medal at the 2009 Hy-Vee ITU Triathlon Elite Cup in Des Moines, Iowa. Campbell also led a group of four Canadians, along with Whitfield, Tremblay, and Brent McMahon, to win the bronze for the mixed relay at the inaugural Team World Championship, and received $10,000 each for crossing the finish line with a time of 1:21:31. In the same year, Campbell finally achieved her highest placement, by winning gold medals each at the ITU Triathlon Pan American Premium Cup, and at the national championships in Kelowna, sharing the same triumphs with Whitfield in the men's event.

After winning her first title, Campbell took a year off from triathlon, following her recovery from a serious physical injury at the world championships, and a prior commitment towards her personal life. In 2011, she returned to the competition under her husband's surname, and won the bronze medal at both the ITU Sprint Triathlon Oceania Cup, and OTU Sprint Triathlon Oceania Championships in Devonport, Tasmania. Following her first medal under a new name, and a ninth-place finish at the ITU Triathlon World Cup in Mooloolaba, Australia, Campbell recaptured her success in the international scene, by winning the gold medal at the 2012 ITU Sprint Triathlon Pan American Cup in Bridgetown, Barbados, and claiming her first-ever career World Cup title in Edmonton.

Personal life
Campbell's father Robert Groves worked as a senior partner of Davis LLP Firm to sponsor and support his daughter's triathlon career. In 2010, she married her long-time partner Adam Campbell, a competitive ultra-marathon and mountain runner from Victoria, British Columbia, who responsibly initiated her career to become a successful triathlete. They were divorced shortly thereafter. Apart from triathlon, she plays badminton and basketball during her off-season, and also spends her free time at a neighbourhood coffee shop, trips to the mall, doing crafts and cooking.

Achievements
Between 2002 and 2012, Campbell took part in 77 triathlon competitions, and had achieved thirty-six top-ten finishes, including eleven medals. Unless indicated otherwise, the events are triathlons (Olympic Distance) and belong to the Elite category. Championships with medals mentioned below are bolded.

References

External links

 
 ITU Profile
 Canadian Olympic Team Profile
 Triathlon Canada Profile

1981 births
Living people
Canadian female triathletes
Triathletes at the 2007 Pan American Games
Triathletes at the 2008 Summer Olympics
Olympic triathletes of Canada
Sportspeople from Vancouver
Sportspeople from Victoria, British Columbia
Pan American Games bronze medalists for Canada
Pan American Games medalists in triathlon
Medalists at the 2007 Pan American Games